Keller's reagent can refer to either of two different mixtures of acids.

In metallurgy, Keller's reagent is a mixture of nitric acid, hydrochloric acid, and hydrofluoric acid, used to etch aluminum alloys to reveal their grain boundaries and orientations. It is also sometimes called Dix–Keller reagent, after E. H. Dix, Jr., and Fred Keller of the Aluminum Corporation of America, who pioneered the use of this technique in the late 1920s and early 1930s.

In organic chemistry, Keller's reagent is a mixture of anhydrous (glacial) acetic acid, concentrated sulfuric acid, and small amounts of ferric chloride, used to detect alkaloids.  Keller's reagent can also be used to detect other kinds of alkaloids via reactions in which it produces products with a wide range of colors. Cohn describes its use to detect the principal components of digitalis. The reaction with this reagent is also known as the Keller–Kiliani reaction, after C. C. Keller and H. Kiliani, who both used it to study digitalis in the late 19th century.

References

Etching
Reagents for organic chemistry